Leiopyrga lineolaris, common name the lined kelp shell, is a species of sea snail, a marine gastropod mollusk in the family Trochidae, the top snails.

Description
The height of the adult shell varies between 8 mm and 12 mm, its diameter between 5 mm and 7 mm. The turreted, slender, thin shell is narrowly perforate. It is shining, white, with longitudinal undulating or zigzag pinkish or purplish lines, often uniting to form spots at the periphery, or prominently angled there. Sometimes it shows spiral bands at the periphery and around the umbilicus. The about 7 whorls are convex, and more or less carinated at the periphery. The carina is exserted above the sutures on the spire. The   surface of the base of the shell is marked by distant impressed concentric grooves. The suture is margined. The aperture is oval. The outer lip is thin. The thin columella is arcuate not truncate, and slightly expanded above, but not covering the umbilicus.

Distribution
This marine species is endemic to Australia and occurs off New South Wales, Tasmania and Victoria.

References

 Gould, A.A. 1861. Descriptions of shells collected by the North Pacific Exploring Expedition (continued). Proceedings of the Boston Society of Natural History 8: 14-40 
 Adams, H. & Adams, A. 1863. Descriptions of five new genera of Mollusca. Annals and Magazine of Natural History 3 11: 18-20
 Smith, E.A. 1884. Mollusca. In, Report on the Zoological Collections made in the Indo-Pacific Ocean during the voyage of H.M.S. "Alert" 1881-82. London : Taylor & Francis
 Pritchard, G.B. & Gatliff, J.H. 1902. Catalogue of the marine shells of Victoria. Part V. Proceedings of the Royal Society of Victoria 14(2): 85-138
 Hedley, C. 1908. Studies on Australian Mollusca. Part 10. Proceedings of the Linnean Society of New South Wales 33: 456-489
 Iredale, T. 1915. A commentary on Suter's "Manual of the New Zealand Mollusca". Transactions of the New Zealand Institute 47: 417-497
 Iredale, T. 1924. Results from Roy Bell's molluscan collections. Proceedings of the Linnean Society of New South Wales 49(3): 179-279, pl. 33-36
 Iredale, T. & McMichael, D.F. 1962. A reference list of the marine Mollusca of New South Wales. Memoirs of the Australian Museum 11: 1-109 
 Wilson, B. 1993. Australian Marine Shells. Prosobranch Gastropods. Kallaroo, Western Australia : Odyssey Publishing Vol. 1 408 pp.

External links
 

lineolaris
Gastropods of Australia
Gastropods described in 1861